492nd may refer to:

492d Bombardment Group, inactive United States Army Air Force unit
492d Bombardment Squadron, inactive United States Air Force unit
492d Fighter Squadron (492 FS), part of the 48th Fighter Wing at RAF Lakenheath, England

See also
492 (number)
492, the year 492 (CDXCII) of the Julian calendar
492 BC